Elias Brendle Monteith House and Outbuildings is a historic home and farmstead located at Dillsboro, Jackson County, North Carolina. The house was built about 1908, and is a -story, front-gable-roof American Craftsman-style frame house with exposed rafter ends and knee braces.  It features an eight-foot-deep porch on four sides.  Also on the property are a number of contributing outbuildings including a greenhouse, two outhouses, a storage shed, a slaughterhouse, barn, a spring house, and a washhouse and cannery.

It was listed on the National Register of Historic Places in 2008.

References

Houses on the National Register of Historic Places in North Carolina
Farms on the National Register of Historic Places in North Carolina
Houses completed in 1908
Buildings and structures in Jackson County, North Carolina
National Register of Historic Places in Jackson County, North Carolina
1908 establishments in North Carolina